The 49th Annual TV Week Logie Awards was held on Sunday 6 May 2007 at the Crown Palladium in Melbourne, and broadcast on the Nine Network. The ceremony was hosted by Adam Hills, Dave Hughes and Fifi Box, while Hamish Blake and Andy Lee were the backstage hosts. Jules Lund, Livinia Nixon and Jackie O hosted the Red Carpet Arrivals. Special guests included Michael Weatherly, Rachel Griffiths, Jessica Alba, Michael Chiklis and Ioan Gruffud.

Winners and nominees
In the tables below, winners are listed first and highlighted in bold.

Gold Logie

Acting/Presenting

Most Popular Programs

Most Outstanding Programs

Performers
Avril Lavigne
Damien Leith
James Morrison

Hall of Fame
Steve Irwin became the 24th induction into the TV Week Logies Hall of Fame posthumously.

References

External links
 

2007
2007 television awards
2007 in Australian television
2007 awards in Australia